Karaali (literally "black Ali" in Turkish) may refer to:

 Karaali, Amasya, a village in the district of Amasya, Amasya Province, Turkey
 Karaali, Baskil
 Karaali, Elâzığ
 Karaali, Gölbaşı, a neighborhood of the district of Gölbaşı, Ankara Province, Turkey
 Karaali, Gümüşhacıköy, a village in the district of Gümüşhacıköy, Amasya Province, Turkey
 Karaali Rocks, a group of rocks in Antarctica